DeMet's Candy Company is a food company based in Connecticut, United States. It is a wholly owned subsidiary of Yıldız Holding.

History 
DeMet's started in 1898 as a candy store business and soda fountain shop by George DeMet of Chicago — subsequently creating Turtles candies.  After a series of mergers and acquisitions, DeMet’s was purchased by Nestlé in 1988.

In 2007, Signature Snacks, acquired the DeMet’s brand from Nestlé.  Former Nestlé USA executive Hendrik Hartong III is chairman of the company.

In 2007, Brynwood Partners bought the "Turtles" brand from Nestle USA Inc., acquiring at the same time the  Turtles production facility in Toronto, Canada — merging the acquisition with a company it owned at the time, Signature Snacks Company.

Subsequently, Brynwood consolidated its portfolio of confectionery acquisitions, which included Stixx, Flipz chocolate covered pretzels, Treasures, and Turtles, resurrecting the dormant DeMet's Candy Company name.  DeMet's acquired the TrueNorth brand of nut snacks from Frito-Lay in 2010 but sold it to B&G Foods in 2013.

In 2013, Brynwood sold the company to Yıldız Holding.

See also 
 Stixx
 Flipz

References

External links 

Multinational companies
Private equity portfolio companies
Biscuit brands
Companies based in Stamford, Connecticut
Bakeries of the United States
American subsidiaries of foreign companies
Yıldız Holding
Food and drink companies established in 1898
1898 establishments in Illinois
1988 mergers and acquisitions
2007 mergers and acquisitions
2013 mergers and acquisitions
Food manufacturers of the United States